A dervish is a Sufi Muslim ascetic.

Dervish or darvish may also refer to:

Movements 

 Dervish movement (Somali), the polity of Diiriye Guure
 Sudanese Dervish or mahdists

Music 

 Dervish (band), an Irish folk band
 Sufi whirling, a type of dance
 Whirling Dervishes

People 

 Dervish Ali Astrakhani (died 1558), Khan of the Astrakhan Khanate
 Dervish Bejah (1862–1957), Australian camel driver
 Dervish Cara, Albanian revolutionary leader
 Dervish Grady, a character in the Demonata series by Darren Shan
 Dervish Hima (1872–1928), Albanian politician
 Kamal Derwish (1973–2002), American citizen killed by the CIA
 Yu Darvish (born 1986), Japanese baseball player

Video games 

 An early name in development for The Arbiter in the Halo video game series
 A profession in Guild Wars Nightfall
 A type of cat in the Postal 2, expansion Apocalypse Weekend
 A car in the racing game Death Rally
 A heavy fighter aircraft in PlanetSide 2

Other uses 

 Dervish (rocket), an American air-launched rocket of the 1950s
 Dervish Convoy, the first of the Allied Arctic convoys of World War II

See also 

 Derviş, a Turkish surname meaning Dervish
 
 
 
 
 Darwish
 Dervish Mehmed Pasha (disambiguation)
 Dervish Pasha (disambiguation)